Kōki Kobayashi is a Japanese politician. He was a Member of the House of Representatives for Tokyo's 10th district from 2003 to 2005.

Background 
Kōki is one of the founding members of New Party Nippon. He lost his seat the House of Representatives to Yuriko Koike on September 11, 2005 during the 2005 Japanese general election.

References 

Japanese politicians
Year of birth missing (living people)
Living people